The 2nd constituency of the Haute-Marne is a French legislative constituency in the Haute-Marne département.

Description

The 2nd constituency in Haute-Marne covers the northern part of the department including Saint-Dizier its largest town.  It also includes Colombey-les-Deux-Eglises, the home and final resting place of Charles de Gaulle.

The seat was held by François Cornut-Gentille for 29 years, between 1993 and 2022, when he lost the seat to RN's Laurence Robert-Dehault.

Historic Representation

Election results

2022 

 
 
|-
| colspan="8" bgcolor="#E9E9E9"|
|-

2017

2012

 
 
 
 
|-
| colspan="8" bgcolor="#E9E9E9"|
|-

Sources

Official results of French elections from 2002: "Résultats électoraux officiels en France" (in French).

2